Arthur Thistlewood (1774–1 May 1820) was an English radical activist and conspirator in the Cato Street Conspiracy.  He planned to murder the cabinet, but there was a spy and he was apprehended with 12 other conspirators. He killed a policeman during the raid. He was executed for treason.

Early life

He was born in Tupholme in Lincolnshire, the extramarital son of a farmer and stockbreeder. He attended Horncastle Grammar School and was trained as a land surveyor. Unsatisfied with his job, he obtained a commission in the army at the age of 21. 

In January 1804, he married Jane Worsley but she died two years later giving birth to their first child. In 1808 he married Susan Wilkinson. He then quit his commission in the army and, with the help of his father, bought a farm. The farm was not a success and in 1811 he moved to London.

Thistlewood was the nephew of Thomas Thistlewood (1721‒1786), a British-born slave owner and plantation overseer in colonial Jamaica.

Beginning of revolutionary involvement

Travel in France and the United States exposed Thistlewood to revolutionary ideas. Shortly after his return to England, he joined the Society of Spencean Philanthropists in London. By 1816, Thistlewood had become a leader in the organisation, and was labelled a "dangerous character" by police, who watched him closely.

Spa Fields

On 2 December 1816, a mass meeting took place at Spa Fields. The Spenceans had planned to encourage rioting all across England and then seize control of the British government by taking the Tower of London and the Bank of England. Police learned of the plan and dispersed the meeting. Thistlewood attempted to flee to North America. 

He and three other leaders were arrested and charged with high treason. When James Watson was acquitted, the authorities released Thistlewood and the others as well.

In 1817 Thistlewood challenged the Home Secretary, Lord Sidmouth, to a duel and was imprisoned in Horsham gaol for 12 months.

Cato Street Conspiracy

On 22 February 1820 Thistlewood was one of a small group of Spenceans who decided, at the prompting of an undercover police agent George Edwards, to assassinate the British cabinet at a dinner the next day hosted by an earl. The group gathered in a loft in the Marylebone area of London, where police officers apprehended the conspirators. Edwards, a police spy, had fabricated the story of the dinner. Thistlewood was convicted of treason for his part in the Cato Street Conspiracy and, together with co-conspirators John Thomas Brunt, William Davidson, John Ings and Richard Tidd, was publicly hanged and decapitated outside Newgate Prison on 1 May 1820.

References

Further reading
 Chase, Malcolm. "Thistlewood, Arthur (bap. 1774, d. 1820)", Oxford Dictionary of National Biography (2004); online edn, Sept 2010 accessed 12 Sept 2014
 Johnson, D. Regency revolution: the case of Arthur Thistlewood (1975).
 Smith, Alan. "Arthur Thistlewood a Regency Republican", History Today (1953) 3#12, pp. 846–852. 
 Stanhope, J. The Cato Street conspiracy (1962).
 Thompson, E. P. The making of the English working class (rev. ed., 1968), pp. 693-695 & 761-775.
 The Times, Tuesday, 2 May 1820 at p. 3, includes a short but detailed biography appended to detailed accounts of the execution.
 Arthur Thistlewood is the central character in Miles Craven's novel, A Street Named Cato (2021).

External links

1774 births
1820 deaths
Executed people from Lincolnshire
English criminals
19th-century executions by the United Kingdom
People executed for treason against the United Kingdom
People educated at Queen Elizabeth's Grammar School, Horncastle
People executed by the United Kingdom by hanging
1817 crimes in the United Kingdom 
1820 crimes in the United Kingdom 
English revolutionaries